Football is the most popular sport in Chile. The country's history of association football began with English sailors and their boat trips due to various commercial links between Chile and Great Britain in the 19th century.

History

Football was first brought to Chile by the English that exhibited the sport during visits to the commercial ports such as in Valparaiso. Chileans living in the area would watch how the sport was being played. In 1880 Chilean aristocratic families incorporated the sport into their regular rituals which brought the first games in Chilean football. This occurred within the confines of the British school called Mackay y Sutherland de Cerro Alegre in Valparaiso.

Chile's oldest club was founded in the port of Valparaiso, and it was named Valparaiso Football Club. The governing body of Chilean football Federación de Fútbol de Chile was established in 1895. Chile was one of the founding members of CONMEBOL which launched the first South American international championship now known as the Copa America.

Other important factors that helped the sport of football spread in Chile were the club tours from other nations, such as Argentina and Peru, held in Chile. Furthermore, the first South American tournaments aided in making Chile a better force in the world of association football. By the time the 1930 FIFA World Cup took place in Uruguay, Chile gave a decent performance but was not able to reach the second round due to losing to Argentina and thus getting second place. The next major step in the international arena took place in the 1962 FIFA World Cup which was held in Chile, and a series of interesting stories were built around the victories of the Chilean team that brought the country joy after the terrible earthquake that had deeply hurt the nation. Although Chile did not win, the team was able to obtain 3rd place in the competition.

Chile is also one of the only one of two national teams in South America to have reached the final of any major FIFA men's senior competitions other than Argentina, Brazil and Uruguay, having finished runners-up in 2017 FIFA Confederations Cup, the other being Venezuela after reaching the final of 2017 FIFA U-20 World Cup held earlier.

Currently, Chilean football remains a strong force in Latin America. Colo-Colo has been the only Chilean club to win a Copa Libertadores championship: the 1991 Copa Libertadores. Also won the Copa Interamericana 1991 and the 1992 Recopa Sudamericana. Other clubs such as Cobreloa, Unión Española and Universidad Católica have played finals finishing in 2nd place. And Universidad de Chile has been the only Chilean club to win a Copa Sudamericana championship.

On women's football, Chile even earns a greater reputation. Colo-Colo was the first non-Brazilian champion in Copa Libertadores Femenina, having done so in 2012 edition, and has since remained a strong force of women's football in South America.

National teams

The Chile national team represents Chile at all international football competitions. The team is controlled by the Federación de Fútbol de Chile which was established in 1895. They won Copa América in 2015 and 2016. They have also appeared in 9 FIFA World Cup tournaments and were hosts of the 1962 FIFA World Cup finishing in 3rd place. Chile achieved their highest ever ranking in FIFA, standing third, between April and May 2016.

A women's team, an under-20 team, and an under-17 team also compete. The Chilean women team qualified for their first ever 2019 FIFA Women's World Cup.

Chile under-17 football team has written history by becoming the first national team of Chile to play in three consecutive FIFA World Cup, having qualified to the 2019 FIFA U-17 World Cup after hosting the 2015 and qualified to the 2017 editions.

In television
Football is the most watched sport on TV.

See also
National teams competitions:
 Chilean Primera División
 Chilean Primera División B

References